Rubrikk Group AS is a company that owns and operates the search engine RUBRIKK.NO in Norway, and similar services in other countries. The company was founded in 2001 by Adil Osmani and Sigbjørn Rivelsrud.  Its headquarters are in Oslo, Norway.
In 2020 Rubrikk Group had a turnover of 50.1 million NOK and a profit of 4.5 million NOK. 
Rubrikk also links to other classifieds websites such as Finn, eBay, kijiji, OLX, Mercadolibre, Yatbo, Quoka, Markt.de, Immonet, and Mobile.de
The company began its internationalization process in 2011 where, among other South Africa was launched. 
The company has now launched services in 15 countries.

Partners 
Rubrikk Group works in partnership with the following companies:
NewsNow (United Kingdom)
Ananzi (South Africa) 
Focus Online (Germany)
Italiaonline (Italy)

Classifieds categories 
The classifieds categories Rubrikk offers are as follows:
Properties
Cars & Vehicles
Jobs
Pets

Sites worldwide

Europe

America

Asia and Oceania

Africa

References

Online marketplaces of Norway
Internet search engines